Vlaky s rokmi (in English transcribed as Friends) is the seventh studio album by Modus, released on OPUS in 1986.

Track listing

Official releases
 1986 Vlaky s rokmi, LP, MC, CD, OPUS, #9113 1632
 1987 Friends, LP, MC, OPUS, #9113 1776

Credits and personnel

 Ján Lehotský – lead vocal, chorus, writer, keyboards
 Pavol Hammel - lead vocal
 Ivona Novotná - lead vocal

 Peter Lipa - lead vocal
 Ľuboš Stankovský - lead vocal
 Kamil Peteraj – lyrics

References

General

Specific

External links 
 

1986 albums
Modus (band) albums